Belkin,  or Belkina (feminine; Белкина), Hebrew:
בלקין is a common Russian and Jewish surname, which is derived from the Russian word belka meaning squirrel (in case of the Russian surname) and the Jewish given name  Beylke (in case of the Jewish surname). It may refer to:

 Arnold Belkin, a Mexican painter
 Boris Belkin, a Russian born violin virtuoso 
 Ivan Petrovich Belkin, a fictional character in Aleksandr Pushkin's The Tales of the Late Ivan Petrovich Belkin
 Katerina Belkina, a Russian photographer and painter
 Lena Belkina, a Ukrainian opera singer
 Mike Belkin, a Canadian tennis player
 Nicholas J. Belkin, a professor at School of Communication at Rutgers University
 Samuel Belkin, a president of the Yeshiva University
 Steve Belkin, businessman and owner of Atlanta Thrashers and Atlanta Hawks
 Yury Belkin, a Russian powerlifter, multiple world record holder

Slavic-language surnames
Russian-language surnames
Jewish surnames